Enrique Romaña (born December 28, 1988), is a Colombian football defender, who plays for La Paz F.C. in Bolivia.

Club career
He previously played for Millonarios in the Copa Mustang. Romaña is a product of the Millonarios youth system and played with the Millonarios first team from November 2007 to March 2010.

References

1988 births
Living people
Colombian footballers
Millonarios F.C. players
La Paz F.C. players
Colombian expatriate footballers
Expatriate footballers in Bolivia
Association football defenders